Paradigm Publishers was an academic, textbook, and trade publisher in social science and the humanities based in Boulder, Colorado.

History
Paradigm was founded in 2003 by Dean Birkenkamp. Its authors included Charles Tilly, Noam Chomsky,  Henry Giroux Pete Seeger, Kofi Annan, Howard Zinn and many influential academic writers. In 2015 the company was sold to Routledge, part of Taylor & Francis.

References

External links
 

Publishing companies of the United States
Companies based in Boulder, Colorado
Educational publishing companies
Publishing companies established in 2003
2003 establishments in Colorado